The 1988 Star World Championships were held in Buenos Aires, Argentina January 19-31, 1988.

Results

References

Star World Championships
1988 in sailing
Sailing competitions in Argentina
 Sports competitions in Buenos Aires